Old Bear Stories is a BAFTA award-winning stop frame animation television series for children based on the Old Bear and Friends books by Jane Hissey. Jane Hissey also created the television series, starting it on 24 September 1993, and creating 3 seasons, which ended on 24 December 1997 with a double-length Christmas special. In all, 41 episodes were made.

The series was produced by Ealing Animation (El Nombre) and was originally broadcast in the United Kingdom on ITV. Episodes have subsequently been repeated on Channel 5 in the UK, and are also broadcast in the United States and other countries worldwide. The show also aired for a short time on the CBC morning children's block in Canada. It also aired in the United States as part of Cartoon Network's Small World as well as ABC in Australia, M-Net, SABC 2 and Bop TV in South Africa, MediaCorp Channel 5 in Singapore, Channel Eye in Sri Lanka, ČT1 in the Czech Republic, TVP1 in Poland, SVT Barnkanalen in Sweden and TV2 and TV One in New Zealand. The series was also screened on armed forces television on BFBS (and its former network SSVC Television) where it was shown in several countries such as Germany and the Falkland Islands.

Episodes of the series were released on VHS by Carlton Video.

Plot
The animals at the play room had remembered that Old Bear disappeared long ago. He had been put into the loft. They rescued him and brought him back down to the Play room. He became the most respected toy and guides the others in their many adventures, both in the play room and in the garden.

Characters
 Old Bear: an elderly dusty teddy bear, he was put up in the attic when he reached an advanced age, but was rescued by the other toys. They now looked up to him as a fearless, yet wise, leader.
 Bramwell Brown: a wise old bear, often considered second to Old Bear. Liked to cook things for the other toys.
 Duck: a gloomy but amiable toy duck. He sometimes wished he could fly, and he didn’t like to get his feet wet.
 Rabbit: an impulsive toy rabbit.
 Little Bear: a small white bear who wore overly baggy orangey red trousers. Being the youngest of all the toys, he was very enthusiastic and inquisitive, rather like a young child. He also sometimes had good ideas for solving problems or playing games.
 Jolly Tall: a toy giraffe who despite his height didn’t like heights - he said his head thought it was high enough already.
 Sailor: a toy sailor who enjoyed sailing in his toy boat.
 Zebra: a female toy zebra.
 Hoot the Owl: a toy owl living in the attic. Originally had a nest made of a bunch of socks that didn't match, until Little Bear gave her an old bobble hat to use instead.
 Ruff the Dog: a bouncy toy dog which resembled a Fox Terrier. 
 Dog: a toy black Scottish Terrier who liked to bury his rubber bones in some plant pots.
 Camel: a toy camel who was almost as tall as Jolly Tall. Once tried to use Little Bear's trousers as hump warmers.
 Cat: a toy cat who liked to nap in any place she found.
 Rabbit's cousin: female cousin of Rabbit, who occasionally stayed with the toys. She wore a straw hat, and seemed to like to cause mischief, and didn’t like cleaning.
 The dolls: a family of 3 dolls (a father, a mother (Mrs. Doll) and a daughter) who lived in a dolls' house in a corner of the play room.

Episodes

Series 1 
Old Bear
Little Bear Lost 
There Were Five In A Bed
Jolly Tall
Little Bear's Trousers
The Circus
The Rainy Day
The Fancy Dress Competition
Little Bear's Big Race
The Apple Tree
The Winter Picnic
Jolly Snow
The Doll's House Christmas

Series 2 
Ruff 
The Play 
The Boat Race
Jigsaw
Little Bear's Book
The Birthday Band
Hot and Spotty
Hoot
Ruff Follows His Nose
Spring Clean 
Old Bear's Chair
Market Day
The Car

Series 3 
Hoot and the Mystery Eggs 
The Clock 
The Castle 
The Colour Chase 
Little Bear's Snowmen 
The Painting 
Duck Tries to Fly 
The Jolly Dragon 
Rabbit and the Visitor 
Little Bear's Cold Day 
Ruff and the Big Wheel 
The Birthday Camp 
The Treasure Hunt

Christmas Specials 
 Little Bear and the Christmas Star
 The Perfect Presents

Cast and crew
 Writer: Jane Hissey
 Director: Kevin Griffiths
 Assistant Director: Liz Whitaker
 Producer: Richard Randolph
 Executive Producer: Peter Gillbe
 Composer: Paul Castle
 Film Editor: Nick Follows
 Assistant Editor: Nick Aleck
 Dubbing Mixer: Nick Glynn-Davies
 Puppet Makers: Monique Brown, Alix Hardwood, Val Johnston, Helen Ranch
 Animators: Fin and Humphrey Leadbitter, Tobias Fouracre, Geoffrey Walker, Dan Ryan, Aziz Samuels
 Props: Pippa Randolph, Sue Phillips, Geoffrey Walker, Donna Joy
 Sets: Colin Armitage, Graeme Owen
 Production Manager: Lynne Pritchard
 Production Assistants: Jilly Clarke, Geoffrey Walker
 Narrator: Anton Rodgers
 Characters Copyright by Jane Hissey, licensed by Random House UK Ltd.
 An Optomen Television Production in association with Ealing Animation and Carlton Television
Copyright Carlton Television UK 1993, 1994, 1996, 1997

Theme music
The theme tune was composed by Paul Castle  and consists of the lyrics:

Please read us a story Old Bear, we'll all gather round

Dear Old Bear.

Sit in your favourite chair,

We'll sit all around, all around dear Old Bear.

Listen 

The harmony vocals were provided by Alison Goldfrapp of the band Goldfrapp.

Awards
The series was very well critically received and won a lot of awards:
 1995 Chicago International Children's Film Festival - Outstanding Achievement Award
 1994 Royal Television Society - Best Children's Series
 1993 BAFTA - Best Children's Programme
 1993 New York Film Festival - Gold Medal
 1993 Chicago International Film Festival - Silver Plaque

See also

 Old Bear and Friends
 Jane Hissey

References

External links
 
 TV.com entry
 Old Bear Stories TV theme song by Paul Castle
 

1993 British television series debuts
1997 British television series endings
1990s British children's television series
1990s British animated television series
British children's animated adventure television series
ITV children's television shows
British television shows based on children's books
British stop-motion animated television series
BAFTA winners (television series)
Television series by ITV Studios
Carlton Television
English-language television shows
Animated television series about bears